EternalBlue is a computer exploit developed by the U.S. National Security Agency (NSA). It was leaked by the Shadow Brokers hacker group on April 14, 2017, one month after Microsoft released patches for the vulnerability.

On May 12, 2017, the worldwide WannaCry ransomware used this exploit to attack unpatched computers. On June 27, 2017, the exploit was again used to help carry out the 2017 NotPetya cyberattack on more unpatched computers.

The exploit was also reported to have been used since March 2016 by the Chinese hacking group Buckeye (APT3), after they likely found and re-purposed the tool, as well as reported to have been used as part of the Retefe banking trojan since at least September 5, 2017.

EternalBlue was among the several exploits used, in conjunction with the DoublePulsar backdoor implant tool, in executing the 2017 WannaCry attacks.

Details
EternalBlue exploits a vulnerability in Microsoft's implementation of the Server Message Block (SMB) protocol. This vulnerability is denoted by entry  in the Common Vulnerabilities and Exposures (CVE) catalog. The vulnerability exists because the SMB version 1 (SMBv1) server in various versions of Microsoft Windows mishandles specially crafted packets from remote attackers, allowing them to remotely execute code on the target computer.

The NSA did not alert Microsoft about the vulnerabilities, and held on to it for more than five years before the breach forced its hand. The agency then warned Microsoft after learning about EternalBlue's possible theft, allowing the company to prepare a software patch issued in March 2017, after delaying its regular release of security patches in February 2017. On Tuesday, March 14, 2017, Microsoft issued security bulletin MS17-010, which detailed the flaw and announced that patches had been released for all Windows versions that were currently supported at that time, these being Windows Vista, Windows 7, Windows 8.1, Windows 10, Windows Server 2008, Windows Server 2012, and Windows Server 2016.

Many Windows users had not installed the patches when, two months later on May 12, 2017, the WannaCry ransomware attack used the EternalBlue vulnerability to spread itself. The next day (May 13, 2017), Microsoft released emergency security patches for the unsupported Windows XP, Windows 8, and Windows Server 2003.

In February 2018, EternalBlue was ported to all Windows operating systems since Windows 2000 by RiskSense security researcher Sean Dillon. EternalChampion and EternalRomance, two other exploits originally developed by the NSA and leaked by The Shadow Brokers, were also ported at the same event. They were made available as open sourced Metasploit modules.

At the end of 2018, millions of systems were still vulnerable to EternalBlue. This has led to millions of dollars in damages due primarily to ransomware worms.  Following the massive impact of WannaCry, both NotPetya and BadRabbit caused over $1 billion worth of damages in over 65 countries, using EternalBlue as either an initial compromise vector or as a method of lateral movement.

In May 2019, the city of Baltimore struggled with a cyberattack by digital extortionists; the attack froze thousands of computers, shut down email and disrupted real estate sales, water bills, health alerts and many other services. Nicole Perlroth, writing for the New York Times, initially attributed this attack to EternalBlue; in a memoir published in February 2021, Perlroth clarified that EternalBlue had not been responsible for the Baltimore cyberattack, while criticizing others for pointing out "the technical detail that in this particular case, the ransomware attack had not spread with EternalBlue".

Since 2012, four Baltimore City chief information officers have been fired or have resigned; two left while under investigation. Some security researchers said that the responsibility for the Baltimore breach lay with the city for not updating their computers. Security consultant Rob Graham wrote in a tweet: "If an organization has substantial numbers of Windows machines that have gone 2 years without patches, then that’s squarely the fault of the organization, not EternalBlue."

Responsibility
According to Microsoft, it was the United States's NSA that was responsible because of its controversial strategy of not disclosing but stockpiling  vulnerabilities.  The strategy prevented Microsoft from knowing of (and subsequently patching) this bug, and presumably other hidden bugs. However several commentators, including Alex Abdo of Columbia University's Knight First Amendment Institute, have criticised Microsoft for shifting the blame to the NSA, arguing that it should be held responsible for releasing a defective product in the same way a car manufacturer might be. The company was faulted for initially restricting the release of its EternalBlue patch to recent Windows users and customers of its $1,000 per device Extended Support contracts, a move that left organisations such the UK's NHS vulnerable to the WannaCry attack. A month after the patch was first released, Microsoft took the rare step of making it available for free to users of all vulnerable Windows editions dating back to Windows XP.

EternalRocks
EternalRocks or MicroBotMassiveNet is a computer worm that infects Microsoft Windows. It uses seven exploits developed by the NSA. Comparatively, the WannaCry ransomware program that infected 230,000 computers in May 2017 only uses two NSA exploits, making researchers believe EternalRocks to be significantly more dangerous. The worm was discovered via a honeypot.

Infection
EternalRocks first installs Tor, a private network that conceals Internet activity, to access its hidden servers. After a brief 24 hour "incubation period", the server then responds to the malware request by downloading and self-replicating on the "host" machine.

The malware even names itself WannaCry to avoid detection from security researchers. Unlike WannaCry, EternalRocks does not possess a kill switch and is not ransomware.

See also

 BlueKeep (security vulnerability) – A similar vulnerability
 Petya (malware)

References

Further reading

External links
Microsoft Security Bulletin MS17-010
Microsoft Update Catalog entries for EternalBlue patches
 Entry in CVE catalog

Computer security exploits
National Security Agency
Windows communication and services